The pound was the currency of Newfoundland until 1865. It was subdivided into 20 shillings, each of 12 pence. The Newfoundland pound was equal to sterling and sterling coin circulated, supplemented by locally produced tokens and banknotes. In 1865, the dollar was introduced at a rate of 1 dollar = 4s.2d., or 1 dollar = 50d.

Tokens

Tokens were privately produced for 1 farthing in 1829, and ½d in 1841, 1846 and 1860.

Banknotes

In 1854, the Union Bank of Newfoundland introduced £1 notes. The same denomination was issued by the Commercial Bank of Newfoundland from 1857. Both banks continued to issue notes denominated in £sd after the introduction of the dollar, although they did issue dollar notes in the 1880s.

See also

 Newfoundland dollar

References

Currencies of Canada
Currencies of the British Empire
Modern obsolete currencies
1865 disestablishments
Economy of Newfoundland and Labrador
Pre-Confederation Newfoundland
1854 establishments in the British Empire